Washington, D.C., formally the District of Columbia, also known as Washington, the District, or D.C., is the capital city and federal district of the United States. The city is located on the east bank of the Potomac River, which forms its southwestern border with Virginia, and it also borders Maryland to its north and east. The city was named for George Washington, a Founding Father, commanding general of the Continental Army in the American Revolutionary War, and the first President of the United States, and the district is named for Columbia, the female personification of the nation.

Washington, D.C., represents the southern point of the Northeast megalopolis, one of the nation's largest and most influential cultural, political, and economic regions that runs along its northeast coast from Boston in the north to Washington, D.C., in the south, and also includes New York City, Philadelphia, and Baltimore. As the seat of the U.S. federal government and several international organizations, the city is an important world political capital. It is one of the most visited cities in the U.S. with over 20 million annual visitors as of 2016.

The U.S. constitution provides for a federal district under the exclusive jurisdiction of the U.S. Congress. Washington, D.C., is not a part of any U.S. state and is not one itself. The Residence Act, adopted on July 16, 1790, approved the creation of the capital district along the Potomac River. The city was founded in 1791, and Congress held its first session there in 1800. In 1801, the territory, formerly part of Maryland and Virginia and including the settlements of Georgetown and Alexandria, was officially recognized as the federal district. In 1846, Congress returned the land originally ceded by Virginia, including the city of Alexandria; in 1871, it created a single municipal government for the remaining portion of the district. There have been several unsuccessful efforts to make the city into a state since the 1880s, though a statehood bill passed the House of Representatives in 2021.

The city is divided into quadrants, which are centered around the Capitol and include 131 neighborhoods. As of the 2020 census, the city had a population of 689,545, making it the 23rd-most populous city in the U.S., third-most populous city in the Southeast behind Jacksonville and Charlotte, and the third-most populous city in the Mid-Atlantic after New York City and Philadelphia. Commuters from the city's Maryland and Virginia suburbs raise the city's daytime population to more than one million during the workweek. The Washington metropolitan area, which includes parts of Maryland, Virginia, and West Virginia, is the country's sixth-largest metropolitan area with a 2020 population of 6.3 million residents; and over 54 million people live within  of the city.

The city is the home to each of the three branches of the U.S. federal government, Congress (legislative), the President (executive), and the Supreme Court (judicial), along with the governmental buildings that house most of the federal government, including the White House, the Capitol, the Supreme Court Building, and multiple federal departments and agencies. The city is home to many national monuments and museums, primarily located on or around the National Mall, including the Jefferson Memorial, the Lincoln Memorial, and the Washington Monument. The city hosts 177 foreign embassies and the headquarters of the World Bank, the International Monetary Fund, the Organization of American States, and other international organizations. Many of the nation's largest industry associations, non-profit organizations, and think tanks are based in the city, including AARP, the American Red Cross, Atlantic Council, Brookings Institution, National Geographic Society, The Heritage Foundation, Wilson Center, and others.

A locally elected mayor and 13-member council have governed the district since 1973. Congress maintains supreme authority over the city, however, and is empowered to overturn local laws. Washington, D.C., residents are, on a federal level, politically disenfranchised since the city's residents do not have voting representation in Congress, although the city's residents elect a single at-large congressional delegate to the U.S. House of Representatives who has no vote. District voters choose three presidential electors in accordance with the Twenty-third Amendment, ratified in 1961. Washington, D.C. has been a member state of the Unrepresented Nations and Peoples Organization since 2015.

History 

Various tribes of the Algonquian-speaking Piscataway people, also known as the Conoy, inhabited the lands around the Potomac River when Europeans arrived and colonized the region in the early 17th century. One group known as the Nacotchtank, also called the Nacostines by Catholic missionaries, maintained settlements around the Anacostia River in present-day Washington, D.C. Conflicts with European colonists and neighboring tribes forced the Piscataway people to relocate, some of whom established a new settlement in 1699 near Point of Rocks, Maryland.

Foundation
Prior to the establishment of Washington, D.C., as the nation's capital in 1800, the Second Continental Congress was based in Philadelphia on five separate occasions (May 1775-July 1776, December 1776-February 1777, March 1777-September 1777, July 1778, July 1778-March 1781, and March 1781-June 1783) and briefly in five other locations, including York, Pennsylvania (September 1777), Princeton, New Jersey (1783), Annapolis, Maryland (November 1783 to August 1784), Trenton, New Jersey (November to December 1784), and New York City (January 1785 to March 1789).

On October 6, 1783, after the capital was forced by the Pennsylvania Mutiny of 1783 to relocate to Princeton, New Jersey, Congress resolved to consider a new location for it. The following day, Elbridge Gerry of Massachusetts moved "that buildings for the use of Congress be erected on the banks of the Delaware near Trenton, or of the Potomac, near Georgetown, provided a suitable district can be procured on one of the rivers as aforesaid, for a federal town".

In his Federalist No. 43, published January 23, 1788, James Madison argued that the new federal government would need authority over a national capital to provide for its own maintenance and safety. The Pennsylvania Mutiny of 1783 emphasized the need for the national government not to rely on any state for its own security.

Article One, Section Eight of the U.S. Constitution permits the establishment of a "District (not exceeding ten miles square) as may, by cession of particular states, and the acceptance of Congress, become the seat of the government of the United States". However, the constitution does not specify a location for the capital. In the Compromise of 1790, Madison, Alexander Hamilton, and Thomas Jefferson agreed that the federal government would pay each state's remaining Revolutionary War debts in exchange for establishing the new national capital in the Southern United States.

On July 9, 1790, Congress passed the Residence Act, which approved the creation of a national capital on the Potomac River. The exact location was to be selected by President George Washington, who signed the bill into law on July 16.

Two preexisting settlements were included in the territory: the port of Georgetown, Maryland, founded in 1751, and the port city of Alexandria, Virginia, founded in 1749. In  1791–92, a team led by Andrew Ellicott, including Ellicott's brothers Joseph and Benjamin and African-American astronomer Benjamin Banneker, surveyed the borders of the federal district and placed boundary stones at every mile point; many of these stones are still standing.

A new federal city was then constructed on the north bank of the Potomac, to the east of Georgetown. On September 9, 1791, the three commissioners overseeing the capital's construction named the city in honor of President Washington. The same day, the federal district was named Columbia, a feminine form of Columbus, which was a poetic name for the United States commonly used at that time. Congress held its first session there on November 17, 1800.

Congress passed the District of Columbia Organic Act of 1801, which officially organized the district and placed the entire territory under the exclusive control of the federal government. The area within the district was organized into two counties, the County of Washington to the east and north of the Potomac and the County of Alexandria to the west and south. After the Act's passage, citizens in the district were no longer considered residents of Maryland or Virginia, which ended their representation in Congress.

Burning during War of 1812 

On August 24–25, 1814, during the War of 1812, British forces invaded and raided Washington, D.C., in what is known as the Burning of Washington. In the attack, the U.S. Capitol, Department of the Treasury, and White House were burned and gutted. Most government buildings were repaired quickly; however, the Capitol was largely under construction at the time and was not completed in its current form until 1868.

Retrocession and the Civil War 

In the 1830s, the district's southern territory of Alexandria declined economically due in part to neglect of it by Congress. Alexandria was a major market in the domestic slave trade and pro-slavery residents feared that abolitionists in Congress would end slavery in the district, further depressing the local economy. Alexandria's citizens petitioned Virginia to take back the land it had donated to form the district through a process known as retrocession.

The Virginia General Assembly voted in February 1846, to accept the return of Alexandria. On July 9, 1846, Congress went further, agreeing to return all territory that Virginia had ceded to the district during its formation. This left the district's area consisting only of the portion originally donated by Maryland. Confirming the fears of pro-slavery Alexandrians, the Compromise of 1850 outlawed the slave trade in the district, although not slavery itself.

The outbreak of the American Civil War in 1861 led to the expansion of the federal government and notable growth in the district's population, including a large influx of freed slaves. President Abraham Lincoln signed the Compensated Emancipation Act in 1862, which ended slavery in the district, freeing about 3,100 slaves in the district nine months prior to the Emancipation Proclamation. In 1868, Congress granted the district's African American male residents the right to vote in municipal elections.

Growth and redevelopment 

By 1870, the district's population had grown 75% from the previous census to nearly 132,000 residents. Despite the city's growth, however, Washington still had dirt roads and the city lacked basic sanitation. Some members of Congress suggested moving the capital farther west, but President Ulysses S. Grant refused to consider the proposal.

Congress passed the Organic Act of 1871, which repealed the individual charters of the cities of Washington and Georgetown, abolished Washington County, and created a new territorial government for the whole District of Columbia.

After the reorganization, in 1873, President Grant appointed Alexander Robey Shepherd as Governor of the District of Columbia. Shepherd authorized large-scale projects that greatly modernized the city but ultimately bankrupted the district government. In 1874, Congress replaced the territorial government with an appointed three-member board of commissioners.

In 1888, the city's first motorized streetcars began service. Their introduction generated growth in areas of the district beyond the City of Washington's original boundaries, leading to an expansion of the district over the next few decades. Georgetown's street grid and other administrative details were formally merged to those of the City of Washington in 1895. However, the city had poor housing conditions and strained public works, leading it to become the first city in the nation to undergo urban renewal projects as part of the City Beautiful movement in the early 20th century.

Increased federal spending as a result of the New Deal in the 1930s led to the construction of new government buildings, memorials, and museums in the district, though the chairman of the House Subcommittee on District Appropriations Ross A. Collins from Mississippi justified cuts to funds for welfare and education for local residents, saying that "my constituents wouldn't stand for spending money on niggers."

World War II led to an expansion of federal employees in the city; by 1950, the district's population reached its peak of 802,178 residents.

Civil rights and home rule era 

The Twenty-third Amendment to the United States Constitution was ratified in 1961, granting the district three votes in the Electoral College for the election of president and vice president, but still not affording the city's residents representation in Congress.

After the assassination of civil rights leader Martin Luther King Jr. on April 4, 1968, riots broke out in the district, primarily in the U Street, 14th Street, 7th Street, and H Street corridors, which were predominantly black residential and commercial areas. The riots raged for three days until more than 13,600 federal troops and Washington, D.C. Army National Guardsmen stopped the violence. Many stores and other buildings were burned, and rebuilding from the riots was not completed until the late 1990s.

In 1973, Congress enacted the District of Columbia Home Rule Act providing for an elected mayor and 13-member council for the district. In 1975, Walter Washington became the district's first elected and first black mayor.

Geography 

Washington, D.C., is located in the mid-Atlantic region of the U.S. East Coast. The district is bordered by Montgomery County, Maryland, to the northwest; Prince George's County, Maryland, to the east; Arlington County, Virginia, to the west; and Alexandria, Virginia, to the south.

The south bank of the Potomac River forms the district's border with Virginia and has two major tributaries, the Anacostia River and Rock Creek. Tiber Creek, a natural watercourse that once passed through the National Mall, was fully enclosed underground during the 1870s. The creek also formed a portion of the now-filled Washington City Canal, which allowed passage through the city to the Anacostia River from 1815 until the 1850s. The Chesapeake and Ohio Canal starts in Georgetown and was used during the 19th century to bypass the Little Falls of the Potomac River, located at the northwest edge of the city at the Atlantic Seaboard fall line.

The lowest point is sea level at the Potomac River. The geographic center of Washington is near the intersection of 4th and L Streets NW.

The district has  of parkland, about 19% of the city's total area and the second-highest percentage among high-density U.S. cities after Philadelphia. The city's sizable parkland was a factor in the city being ranked as third in the nation for park access and quality in the 2018 ParkScore ranking of the park systems of the nation's 100 most populous cities, according to Trust for Public Land, a non-profit organization.

Rock Creek Park is a  urban forest in Northwest Washington, which extends  through a stream valley that bisects the city. Established in 1890, it is the country's fourth-oldest national park and is home to a variety of plant and animal species, including raccoon, deer, owls, and coyotes. Other National Park Service properties include the Chesapeake and Ohio Canal National Historical Park, the National Mall and Memorial Parks, Theodore Roosevelt Island, Columbia Island, Fort Dupont Park, Meridian Hill Park, Kenilworth Park and Aquatic Gardens, and Anacostia Park. The District of Columbia Department of Parks and Recreation maintains the city's  of athletic fields and playgrounds, 40 swimming pools, and 68 recreation centers. The U.S. Department of Agriculture operates the  United States National Arboretum in Northeast Washington, D.C..

Climate 

Washington, D.C., is in the humid subtropical climate zone (Köppen: Cfa). The Trewartha classification is defined as an oceanic climate (Do). Winters are cool to cold with light snow more common but heavy snow not uncommon, and summers are hot and humid. The district is in plant hardiness zone 8a near downtown, and zone 7b elsewhere in the city, indicating a humid subtropical climate.

Spring and fall are mild to warm while winter is cool to cold with annual snowfall averaging .

Heat indices regularly approach  at the height of summer. The combination of heat and humidity in the summer brings very frequent thunderstorms, some of which occasionally produce tornadoes in the area.

Blizzards affect Washington once every four to six years on average. The most violent storms, known as nor'easters, often impact large regions of the East Coast. From January 27 to 28, 1922, the city officially received  of snowfall, the largest snowstorm since official measurements began in 1885.

Hurricanes or their remnants occasionally impact the area in late summer and early fall. However, they usually are weak by the time they reach Washington, D.C., partly due to the city's inland location. Flooding of the Potomac River, however, caused by a combination of high tide, storm surge, and runoff, has been known to cause extensive property damage in the Georgetown neighborhood of the city. Precipitation occurs throughout the year.

During a typical year, the city averages about 37 days at or above  and 64 nights at or below the freezing mark. On average, the first day with a minimum at or below freezing is November 18 and the last day is March 27.

Cityscape

Washington, D.C., was a planned city, and many of the District's street grids were developed in that initial plan. In 1791, President George Washington commissioned Pierre (Peter) Charles L'Enfant, a French-born architect and city planner, to design the new capital, and enlisted Scottish surveyor Alexander Ralston to help lay out the city plan. The L'Enfant Plan featured broad streets and avenues radiating out from rectangles, providing room for open space and landscaping. L'Enfant based his design on plans of other major world cities, including Paris, Amsterdam, Karlsruhe, and Milan that Thomas Jefferson had sent to him. In March 1792, however, President Washington dismissed L'Enfant due to conflicts with the three commissioners appointed to supervise the capital's construction. Andrew Ellicott, who worked with L'Enfant in surveying the city, was then tasked with completing its design. Though Ellicott revised the original L'Enfant plans, including changing some street patterns, L'Enfant is still credited with the city's overall design.

By the early 20th century, however, L'Enfant's vision of a grand national capital was marred by slums and randomly placed buildings in the city, including a railroad station on the National Mall. Congress formed a special committee charged with beautifying Washington's ceremonial core. What became known as the McMillan Plan was finalized in 1901 and included relandscaping the Capitol grounds and the National Mall, clearing slums, and establishing a new citywide park system. The plan is thought to have largely preserved L'Enfant's intended design for the city.

By law, the skyline of Washington, D.C., is low and sprawling. The federal Height of Buildings Act of 1910 prohibits buildings exceeding the width of the adjacent street plus . Despite popular belief, no law has ever limited buildings to the height of the United States Capitol or the  Washington Monument, which remains the district's tallest structure. City leaders have criticized the height restriction as a primary reason why the district has limited affordable housing and traffic problems caused partly by suburban sprawl.

The district is divided into four quadrants of unequal area: Northwest (NW), Northeast (NE), Southeast (SE), and Southwest (SW). The axes bounding the quadrants radiate from the U.S. Capitol. All road names include the quadrant abbreviation to indicate their location and house numbers generally correspond with the number of blocks away from the Capitol. Most streets are set out in a grid pattern with east–west streets named with letters (e.g., C Street SW), north–south streets with numbers (e.g., 4th Street NW), and diagonal avenues, many of which are named after states.

The City of Washington was bordered by Boundary Street to the north (renamed Florida Avenue in 1890), Rock Creek to the west, and the Anacostia River to the east. Washington's street grid was extended, where possible, throughout the district starting in 1888. Georgetown's streets were renamed in 1895. Some streets are particularly noteworthy, including Pennsylvania Avenue, which connects the White House to the Capitol, and K Street, which houses the offices of many lobbying groups. Constitution Avenue and Independence Avenue, located on the north and south sides of the National Mall, respectively, are home to many of Washington's iconic museums, including the Smithsonian Institution buildings and the National Archives Building. Washington hosts 177 foreign embassies, constituting approximately 297 buildings beyond the more than 1,600 residential properties owned by foreign countries, many of which are on a section of Massachusetts Avenue informally known as Embassy Row.

Architecture 

The architecture of Washington, D.C., varies greatly and is generally popular among tourists and locals. Six of the top 10 buildings in the American Institute of Architects' 2007 ranking of "America's Favorite Architecture" are in the city: the White House, Washington National Cathedral, the Jefferson Memorial, the United States Capitol, the Lincoln Memorial, and the Vietnam Veterans Memorial. The neoclassical, Georgian, Gothic, and Modern styles are reflected among these six structures and many other prominent edifices in the city.

Many of the government buildings, monuments, and museums along the National Mall and surrounding areas are heavily inspired by classical Roman and Greek architecture. The designs of the White House, the U.S. Capitol, Supreme Court Building, Washington Monument, National Gallery of Art, Lincoln Memorial, and Jefferson Memorial are all heavily drawn from these classical architectural movements and feature large pediments, domes, columns in classical order, and heavy stone walls. Notable exceptions to the city's classical-style architecture include buildings constructed in the French Second Empire style, including the Eisenhower Executive Office Building. The Thomas Jefferson Building, the main Library of Congress building, and the historic Willard Hotel are built in Beaux-Arts style. Meridian Hill Park contains a cascading waterfall with Italian renaissance-style architecture.

Modern, Postmodern, contemporary, and other non-classical architectural styles are also seen in the city's buildings. The National Museum of African American History and Culture deeply contrasts the stone-based neoclassical buildings on the National Mall with a design that combines modern engineering with heavy inspiration from African art. The interior of the Washington Metro stations and the Hirshhorn Museum and Sculpture Garden are designed with strong influence from the 20th-century Brutalism movement. The Smithsonian Institution Building is built of Seneca red sandstone in the Norman Revival style. The Old Post Office building, located on Pennsylvania Avenue and completed in 1899, was the first building in the city to have a steel frame structure and the first to utilize electrical wiring in its design.

Notable contemorary residential buildings, restaurants, shops, and office buildings in the city include the Wharf on the Southwest Waterfront; Navy Yard along the Anacostia River; and CityCenterDC located Downtown. The Wharf, given its proximity to the Potomac River, has seen the construction of several high-rise office and residential buildings overlooking the river. Additionally, restaurants, bars, and shops have been opened at street level. Many of these buildings have a modern glass exterior and heavy curvature. CityCenterDC is home to Palmer Alley, a pedestrian-only walkway, and houses several apartment buildings, restaurants, and luxury-brand storefronts with streamlined glass and metal facades.

Outside Downtown D.C., architectural styles are more varied. Historic buildings are designed primarily in the Queen Anne, Châteauesque, Richardsonian Romanesque, Georgian Revival, Beaux-Arts, and a variety of Victorian styles. Rowhouses are prominent in areas developed after the Civil War and typically follow Federal and late Victorian designs. Georgetown's Old Stone House, built in 1765, is the oldest-standing building in the city. Founded in 1789, Georgetown University features a mix of Romanesque and Gothic Revival architecture. The Ronald Reagan Building is the largest building in the district with a total area of approximately 3.1 million square feet (288,000 m2). Washington Union Station is designed from a combination of different architectural styles. Its Great Hall, which serves as the main hall within the building, has elaborate gold leaf designs along the ceilings and the hall includes several decorative classical-style statues.

Demographics 

The U.S. Census Bureau estimates that the district's population was 705,749 as of July 2019, an increase of more than 100,000 people compared to the 2010 United States Census. When measured on a decade-over-decade basis, this continues a growth trend since 2000, following a half-century of population decline. But on a year-over-year basis, the July 2019 census count shows a population decline of 16,000 individuals over the preceding 12-month period. Washington was the 24th most populous place in the United States . According to data from 2010, commuters from the suburbs increase the district's daytime population to over a million. If the district were a state it would rank 49th in population, ahead of Vermont and Wyoming.

The Washington metropolitan area, which includes the district and surrounding suburbs, is the sixth-largest metropolitan area in the U.S. with an estimated six million residents as of 2016. When the Washington area is included with Baltimore and its suburbs, it forms the vast Washington–Baltimore combined statistical area. With a population exceeding 9.8 million residents in 2020, it is the third-largest combined statistical area in the country.

According to HUD's 2022 Annual Homeless Assessment Report, there were an estimated 4,410 homeless people in Washington, D.C. 

According to 2017 Census Bureau data, the population of Washington, D.C. was 47.1% Black or African American, 45.1% White (36.8% non-Hispanic White), 4.3% Asian, 0.6% American Indian or Alaska Native, and 0.1% Native Hawaiian or Other Pacific Islander. Individuals from two or more races made up 2.7% of the population. Hispanics of any race made up 11.0% of the district's population.

Washington has had a significant African American population since the city's foundation. African American residents composed about 30% of the district's total population between 1800 and 1940. The black population reached a peak of 70% by 1970, but has since steadily declined due to many African Americans moving to the surrounding suburbs. Partly as a result of gentrification, there was a 31.4% increase in the non-Hispanic white population and an 11.5% decrease in the black population between 2000 and 2010. According to a study by the National Community Reinvestment Coalition, D.C. has experienced more "intense" gentrification than any other American city, with 40% of neighborhoods gentrified.

Approximately 17% of Washington, D.C. residents were age 18 or younger as of 2010, lower than the U.S. average of 24%. However, at 34 years old, the district had the lowest median age compared to the 50 states as of 2010. , there were an estimated 81,734 immigrants living in Washington, D.C. Major sources of immigration include El Salvador, Vietnam, and Ethiopia, with a concentration of Salvadorans in the Mount Pleasant neighborhood.

As of 2010, there were 4,822 same-sex couples in the city, about 2% of total households, according to Williams Institute. Legislation authorizing same-sex marriage passed in 2009, and the district began issuing marriage licenses to same-sex couples in March 2010.

Approximately a third of Washington, D.C., residents were functionally illiterate as of 2007 compared to a national rate of about one in five. The city's relatively high illiteracy rate is attributed in part to immigrants who are not proficient in English. , 85% of D.C. residents age5 and older spoke English at home as a primary language. Half of residents had at least a four-year college degree in 2006. In 2017, the median household income in D.C. was $77,649; also in 2017, D.C. residents had a personal income per capita of $50,832 (higher than any of the 50 states). However, 19% of residents were below the poverty level in 2005, higher than any state except Mississippi. In 2019, the poverty rate stood at 14.7%.

, more than 90% of Washington, D.C., residents had health insurance coverage, the second-highest rate in the nation. This is due in part to city programs that help provide insurance to low-income individuals who do not qualify for other types of coverage. A 2009 report found that at least three percent of Washington, D.C., residents have HIV or AIDS, which the Centers for Disease Control and Prevention (CDC) characterizes as a "generalized and severe" epidemic.

Of the district's population, 17% are Baptist, 13% are Catholic, 6% are evangelical Protestant, 4% are Methodist, 3% are Episcopalian or Anglican, 3% are Jewish, 2% are Eastern Orthodox, 1% are Pentecostal, 1% are Buddhist, 1% are Adventist, 1% are Lutheran, 1% are Muslim, 1% are Presbyterian, 1% are Mormon, and 1% are Hindu. The city is populated with many religious buildings, including the Washington National Cathedral, the Basilica of the National Shrine of the Immaculate Conception, which comprises the largest Catholic church building in the United States, and the Islamic Center of Washington, which was the largest mosque in the Western Hemisphere when opened in 1957. St. John's Episcopal Church, located off Lafayette Square, has held services for every U.S. president since James Madison. The Sixth & I Historic Synagogue, built in 1908, is a synagogue located in the Chinatown section of the city. The Washington D.C. Temple is a large Mormon temple located just outside the city in Kensington, Maryland. Viewable from the Capital Beltway, the Washington, D.C. Mormon Temple is the tallest Mormon temple in existence and the third-largest by square footgage.

Economy 

As of 2020, the Washington metropolitan area, including Washington, D.C., and parts of Northern Virginia, Maryland, and West Virginia, was the nation's fourth-largest metropolitan economy as measured by gross metropolitan product (GMP). Its growing and diversified economy has an increasing percentage of professional and business service jobs in addition to more traditional jobs rooted in tourism, entertainment, and government.

Between 2009 and 2016, gross domestic product per capita in Washington, D.C., consistently ranked at the very top among U.S. states. In 2016, at $160,472, its GDP per capita was almost three times greater than that of Massachusetts, which was ranked second in the nation.
, the metropolitan statistical area's unemployment rate was 3.1%, ranking 171 out of the 389 metropolitan areas as defined by the U.S. Bureau of Economic Analysis. The District of Columbia itself had an unemployment rate of 4.6% during the same time period. In 2019, Washington, D.C., had the highest median household income in the U.S. at $92,266.

Federal government

As of July 2022, 25% of people employed in Washington, D.C., were employed by the federal government. The vast majority of these government employees serve in various executive branch departments, agencies, and institutions, and only a small percentage serve as temporary staff for presidents, Congress members, or in the federal judiciary.

Many of the region's residents work for companies and organizations that sign contracts with the federal government or work on issues directly related to the work of the federal government, including law firms, defense contractors, civilian contractors, nonprofit organizations, lobbying firms, trade unions, industry trade groups, and professional associations, many of which have their headquarters in or near Washington, D.C., in order to maintain proximity to the federal government. The largest U.S. government agencies located in or near the city are: (1) the United States Department of Defense headquartered in the Pentagon in Arlington County, (2) the United States Postal Service, (3) the United States Department of Veterans Affairs, (4) the United States Department of Homeland Security, and (5) the United States Department of Justice.

Diplomacy and global finance 

Washington, D.C. hosts more than 175 embassies, ambassador’s residences and international cultural centers. Embassy Row is the informal name given to a stretch of Massachusetts Avenue that is occupied by many of the city's foreign embassies. Washington, D.C., is one of the most diverse cities in the world. In 2008, the foreign diplomatic corps in the city employed approximately 10,000 people and contributed an estimated $400 million annually to the local economy.

Many prominent global financial and diplomatic institutions are headquartered in the city, including the World Bank, the International Monetary Fund (IMF), the Organization of American States, the Inter-American Development Bank, and the Pan American Health Organization. These institutions seek to use money lending and other financial and economic tools to improve the state of countries' economy and development. The Federal Reserve, which is the central bank in the U.S., is located on Constitution Avenue. Commonly called The Fed, its policies are made by the members of the Federal Reserve Board of Governors. Through monetary policy, the Board adjusts various interest rates in the U.S., which heavily impacts the U.S. economy and economies for countries across the world. Because of the power of the U.S. dollar, the actions of the Board are monitored closely by political, economic, and diplomatic leaders around the world.

Research and non-profit organizations 

Washington, D.C., is a leading center for national and international research organizations, especially think tanks that engage on public policy. Several of the nation's largest and most cited think tanks are headquartered in the city, including the Carnegie Endowment for International Peace, Center for Strategic and International Studies, Peterson Institute for International Economics, The Heritage Foundation, Urban Institute, and others. As of 2020, 8% of the country's think tanks are headquartered in Washington, D.C. Many non-think tanks are also leading research centers, such as the MedStar Washington Hospital Center and the Children's National Medical Center.

The city is home to many non-profit organizations that engage with issues of domestic and global importance by conducting advanced research, running programs, or advocating on behalf of people. Many of these organizations are headquartered or have major offices in the city. Among these organizations are the UN Foundation, Human Rights Campaign, Amnesty International, and the National Endowment for Democracy. The city is also the country's primary location for international development firms, many of whom find funding by contracting with the United States Agency for International Development (USAID), which is the U.S. federal government's aid agency and is located in the city. The American Red Cross, a humanitarian agency focused on emergency relief, is headquartered in the city.

Private sector 

According to statistics compiled in 2011, four of the largest 500 companies in the country were headquartered in Washington, D.C. In the 2021 Global Financial Centres Index, Washington was ranked as having the 14th most competitive financial center in the world, and fourth most competitive in the United States (after New York City, San Francisco, and Los Angeles). Among the largest companies headquartered in Washington, D.C., are Fannie Mae, Amtrak, Lockheed Martin, Marriot International, Danaher Corporation, FTI Consulting, and Hogan Lovells.

Due to the building height restrictions in Washington, D.C., taller buildings are able to be built in suburban Maryland and Virginia. Capital One Bank, which is one of the largest banks in the country, is headquartered in nearby Tysons, Virginia, a large and growing financial center located in Fairfax County. The headquarter building for Capital One Bank, known as Capital One Tower, is the tallest occupied building in the Washington region. In 2018, Amazon announced it would build a second headquarters building, known as HQ2, in the Crystal City neighborhood of Arlington County, Virginia, which is located just across the Potomac River from Washington, D.C. In addition to Capital One, some of the largest companies headquartered in Northern Virginia include Hilton, Navy Federal Credit Union, Mars, Freddie Mac, Northrop Grumman, and General Dynamics.

The Washington, D.C., economy also benefits from being home to many prominent news and media organizations. Among these are The Washington Post, The Washington Times, Politico, and The Hill. There are also many television and radio media organizations either headquartered in or near the city or with large offices in the region, such as CNN, PBS, C-SPAN, CBS, NBC, Discovery, and NPR, among others. The Gannett Company is a mass media holding company headquartered in Tysons, Virginia, which owns numerous national and local newspapers that publish across the country. Gannett is the largest U.S. newspaper publisher as measured by total daily circulation. Most notably, it is the owner of USA Today, which itself is headquartered in Tysons, and which is by far the largest newspaper in the United States by circulation.

Tourism 

Tourism is Washington's second-largest industry, after the federal government. Approximately 18.9 million visitors contributed an estimated $4.8 billion to the local economy in 2012. In 2019, the number of tourists who visited the city increased to 24.6 million, of which 22.8 million were domestic tourists. In total, the tourists spent $8.15 billion during their stay. This heavy tourism helps many of the region's other industries, such as lodging, food and beverage, entertainment, shopping, and transportation. Additionally, tourism helps the city maintain a robust network of world-class museums and cultural centers, most notably the Smithsonian Institution.

The city and wider Washington region has a diverse array of attractions for tourists, such as monuments, memorials, museums, sports events, and trails. Within the city, the National Mall serves as the center of the tourism industry. It is there that many of the city's museums and monuments are located. Adjacent to the mall sits the Tidal Basin, where several additional memorials and monuments lie, including the popular Jefferson Memorial. Additionally, Union Station is a very popular tourist spot with its multitude of restaurants and shops. Among the most visited tourist destinations is Arlington National Cemetery in nearby Arlington County, Virginia. This is a military cemetery that serves as a burial ground for former military combatants. It is also the location of President John F. Kennedy's tomb, marked by an eternal flame. President William Howard Taft is also buried in Arlington. The Tomb of the Unknown Soldier is located in the cemetery and is guarded 24/7 by a tomb guard. The changing of the guard is a popular tourist attraction and occurs once every hour from October through March and every half-hour during the rest of the year.

Culture

Arts 

Washington, D.C., is a national center for the arts and houses numerous leading concert halls and theaters. The John F. Kennedy Center for the Performing Arts is home to the National Symphony Orchestra, the Washington National Opera, and the Washington Ballet. The Kennedy Center Honors are awarded each year to those in the performing arts who have contributed greatly to the cultural life of the United States. This ceremony is often attended by the sitting U.S. president as well as other dignitaries and celebrities. The Kennedy Center also awards the annual Mark Twain Prize for American Humor, which is one of the most prestigious comedy awards in the U.S. The historic Ford's Theatre, site of the assassination of President Abraham Lincoln, continues to operate as a functioning performance space as well as a museum.

The Marine Barracks near Capitol Hill houses the United States Marine Band; founded in 1798, it is the country's oldest professional musical organization. American march composer and Washington-native John Philip Sousa led the Marine Band from 1880 until 1892. Founded in 1925, the United States Navy Band has its headquarters at the Washington Navy Yard and performs at official events and public concerts around the city.

Founded in 1950, Arena Stage achieved national attention and spurred growth in the city's independent theater movement that now includes organizations such as the Shakespeare Theatre Company, Woolly Mammoth Theatre Company, and the Studio Theatre. Arena Stage opened its newly renovated home in the city's emerging Southwest waterfront area in 2010. The GALA Hispanic Theatre, now housed in the historic Tivoli Theatre in Columbia Heights, was founded in 1976 and is a National Center for the Latino Performing Arts.

Other performing arts spaces in the city include the Andrew W. Mellon Auditorium in Federal Triangle, the Atlas Performing Arts Center on H Street, the Carter Barron Amphitheater in Rock Creek Park, Constitution Hall in Downtown, the National Theatre in Downtown, the Keegan Theatre in Dupont Circle, the Lisner Auditorium in Foggy Bottom, the Sylvan Theater on the National Mall, and the Warner Theatre in Penn Quarter.

The U Street Corridor in Northwest D.C., once known as "Washington's Black Broadway", is home to institutions like the Howard Theatre, Bohemian Caverns, and the Lincoln Theatre, which hosted music legends such as Washington-native Duke Ellington, John Coltrane, and Miles Davis. Just east of U Street is Shaw, which also served as a major cultural center during the jazz age. Intersecting with U Street is Fourteenth Street, which was an extension of the U Street cultural corridor during the 1920s through the 1960s. The collection of Fourteenth Street, U Street, and Shaw was the location of the Black Renaissance in D.C., which was part of the larger Harlem Renaissance. Today, the area starting at Fourteenth Street downtown going north through U Street and east to Shaw boasts a high concentration of bars, restaurants, and theaters, and is among the city's most notable cultural and artistic areas.

Washington has its own native music genre called go-go; a post-funk, percussion-driven flavor of rhythm and blues that was popularized in the late 1970s by D.C. band leader Chuck Brown.

The district is an important center for indie culture and music in the United States. The label Dischord Records, formed by Ian MacKaye, frontman of Fugazi, was one of the most crucial independent labels in the genesis of 1980s punk and eventually indie rock in the 1990s. Modern alternative and indie music venues like The Black Cat and the 9:30 Club bring popular acts to the U Street area. The hardcore punk scene in the city, known as D.C. hardcore, is an important genre of D.C.'s contemporary music scene. Starting in the 1970s, it is considered to be one of the most influential punk music movements in the country.

Cuisine 

Washington, D.C., is rich in both fine dining as well as casual eating, and is now considered by many to be one of the best cities for dining in the United States. The city benefits from a diverse food scene made up of restaurants with a wide variety of international cuisines. The city's Chinatown, for example, is filled with Chinese-style restaurants. The city also has many Middle Eastern, European, African, Asian, and Latin American cuisine options. D.C. is known for being one of the best cities in the world for Ethiopian cuisine, due in part to the heavy influx of Ethiopian immigrants during the 20th century, many of whom opened restaurants in the city. A part of the Shaw neighborhood in central D.C. is known as "Little Ethiopia" and has a high concentration of Ethiopian restaurants and shops.

Despite the cosmopolitan nature of the city, D.C. is known for being the birthplace of particular foods and has some recognizable restaurants and eateries. Among the most famous D.C.-born food is the half-smoke, which is a half-beef, half-pork sausage placed in a hotdog-style bun and topped with onion, chilly, and cheese. Additionally, the city is the birthplace of mumbo sauce, a type of condiment often placed on meat and french fries. This sauce is similar to barbecue sauce but sweeter in flavor. Georgetown Cupcake is a cupcake restaurant whose fame grew following its appearance on the reality T.V. show DC Cupcakes. Washington, D.C., is also known for popularizing the jumbo slice pizza, which is an enlarged New York-style pizza. The jumbo slice has particular roots in the Adams Morgan neighborhood. Due to limited dining options along the National Mall, the city is known for having a heavy concentration of food trucks offering diverse ethnic cuisine options parked along the tourist-dense areas of the mall.

Among the District's signature restaurants is Ben's Chili Bowl, which has been located on U Street since its founding in 1958. The restaurant rose to prominence as a peaceful escape during the violent 1968 race riots in the city. The restaurant is famous for its chili dogs and half-smokes. The restaurant has been visited by numerous presidents and celebrities over the years.

Washington, D.C.,'s fine dining options are extensive, with the Michelin Guide awarding numerous D.C. restaurants with prestigious Michelin stars in recent years. The city currently has the third-highest number of Michelin stars in the country, only after New York City and San Francisco. The city's growth as a fine dining location has garnered the attention of many celebrity chefs, who have opened restaurants in the city. Among these chefs are José Andrés, Kwame Onwuachi, Gordon Ramsay, and previously Michel Richard.

Media 

Washington, D.C., is a prominent center for national and international media. The Washington Post, founded in 1877, is the oldest and most-read local daily newspaper in Washington. "The Post", as it is popularly called, is well known as the newspaper that exposed the Watergate scandal. It had the sixth-highest readership of all news dailies in the country in 2011. From 2003 to 2019, The Washington Post Company published a daily free commuter newspaper called the Express, which summarized events, sports and entertainment; it still publishes the Spanish-language paper El Tiempo Latino. The Atlantic magazine, which covers politics, international affairs, and cultural issues, is also headquartered in Washington.

Another popular local daily is The Washington Times, the city's second general interest broadsheet and also an influential paper in conservative political circles. The alternative weekly Washington City Paper, with a circulation of 47,000, is also based in the city and has a substantial readership in the Washington area.

Some community and specialty papers focus on neighborhood and cultural issues, including the weekly Washington Blade and Metro Weekly, which focus on LGBT issues; the Washington Informer and The Washington Afro American, which highlight topics of interest to the black community; and neighborhood newspapers published by The Current Newspapers. Congressional Quarterly, The Hill, Politico, and Roll Call newspapers focus exclusively on issues related to Congress and the federal government. Other publications based in Washington include the National Geographic magazine and political publications such as The Washington Examiner, The New Republic, and Washington Monthly.

The Washington Metropolitan Area is the ninth-largest television media market in the nation, with two million homes, approximately 2% of the country's population. Several media companies and cable television channels have their headquarters in the area, including C-SPAN; Radio One; the National Geographic Channel; Smithsonian Networks; National Public Radio (NPR); Travel Channel (in Chevy Chase, Maryland); Discovery Communications (in Silver Spring, Maryland); and the Public Broadcasting Service (PBS) (in Arlington County, Virginia). The headquarters of Voice of America, the U.S. government's international news service, is near the Capitol in Southwest Washington.

Washington has two local NPR affiliates, WAMU and WETA.

Museums

Smithsonian museums 

The Smithsonian Institution is an educational foundation chartered by Congress in 1846 that maintains most of the nation's official museums and galleries in Washington, D.C. It is the world's largest research and museum complex. The U.S. government partially funds the Smithsonian, and its collections are open to the public free of charge. The Smithsonian's locations had a combined total of 30 million visits in 2013. The most visited museum is the National Museum of Natural History on the National Mall. Other Smithsonian Institution museums and galleries on the mall are: the National Air and Space Museum; the National Museum of African Art; the National Museum of American History; the National Museum of the American Indian; the Sackler and Freer galleries, which both focus on Asian art and culture; the Hirshhorn Museum and Sculpture Garden; the Arts and Industries Building; the S. Dillon Ripley Center; and the Smithsonian Institution Building (also known as "The Castle"), which serves as the institution's headquarters.
The Smithsonian American Art Museum and the National Portrait Gallery are housed in the Old Patent Office Building, near Washington's Chinatown. The Renwick Gallery is officially part of the Smithsonian American Art Museum but is in a separate building near the White House. Other Smithsonian museums and galleries include: the Anacostia Community Museum in Southeast Washington; the National Postal Museum near Union Station; and the National Zoo in Woodley Park.

Other museums 

The National Gallery of Art is on the National Mall near the Capitol and features American and European artworks. The U.S. government owns the gallery and its collections. However, they are not a part of the Smithsonian Institution. The National Building Museum, which occupies the former Pension Building near Judiciary Square, was chartered by Congress and hosts exhibits on architecture, urban planning, and design. The Botanic Garden is a botanical garden and museum operated by the U.S. Congress that is open to the public.

There are several private art museums in Washington, D.C., which house major collections and exhibits open to the public, such as the National Museum of Women in the Arts and The Phillips Collection in Dupont Circle, the first museum of modern art in the United States. Other private museums in Washington include the Newseum, the O Street Museum, the International Spy Museum, the National Geographic Society Museum, and the Museum of the Bible. The United States Holocaust Memorial Museum near the National Mall maintains exhibits, documentation, and artifacts related to the Holocaust.

Sports 

Washington is one of 13 cities in the United States with teams from all four major professional men's sports and is home to one major professional women's team. The Washington Wizards (National Basketball Association) and the Washington Capitals (National Hockey League) play at the Capital One Arena in Chinatown. The Washington Mystics (Women's National Basketball Association) play in the St. Elizabeths East Entertainment and Sports Arena. Nationals Park, which opened in Southeast D.C. in 2008, is home to the Washington Nationals (Major League Baseball). D.C. United (Major League Soccer) plays at Audi Field. The Washington Commanders (National Football League) play at FedExField in nearby Landover, Maryland.

D.C. teams have won a combined thirteen professional league championships: the Washington Commanders (then named the Washington Redskins) have won five (including three Super Bowls during the 1980s); D.C. United has won four; and the Washington Wizards (then the Washington Bullets), Washington Capitals, Washington Mystics and Washington Nationals have each won a single championship.

Other professional and semi-professional teams in Washington include: DC Defenders (XFL), Old Glory DC (Major League Rugby), the Washington Kastles (World TeamTennis); the Washington D.C. Slayers (USA Rugby League); the Baltimore Washington Eagles (U.S. Australian Football League); the D.C. Divas (Independent Women's Football League); and the Potomac Athletic Club RFC (Rugby Super League). The William H.G. FitzGerald Tennis Center in Rock Creek Park hosts the Citi Open. Washington is also home to two major annual marathon races: the Marine Corps Marathon, which is held every autumn, and the Rock 'n' Roll USA Marathon held in the spring. The Marine Corps Marathon began in 1976 and is sometimes called "The People's Marathon" because it is the largest marathon that does not offer prize money to participants.

The district's four NCAA Division I teams are the American Eagles, George Washington Colonials, Georgetown Hoyas, and Howard Bison and Lady Bison. The Georgetown men's basketball team is the most notable and also plays at the Capital One Arena. From 2008 to 2012, the district hosted an annual college football bowl game at RFK Stadium, called the Military Bowl. The D.C. area is home to one regional sports television network, NBC Sports Washington, based in Bethesda, Maryland.

Landmarks

National Mall and Tidal Basin 

The National Mall is a large, open park near Downtown Washington between the Lincoln Memorial and the United States Capitol. Given its prominence, the mall is often the location of political protests, concerts, festivals, and presidential inaugurations. The grounds of the Capitol are the location for the annual National Memorial Day Concert, held every year on Memorial Day, as well as A Capitol Fourth, a concert held annually on Independence Day. Both concerts are broadcast across the country on PBS. In the evening on the Fourth of July, the park is home to a large fireworks show.

The Washington Monument and the Jefferson Pier are near the center of the mall, south of the White House. Located on the mall directly northwest of the Washington Monument is Constitution Gardens, which includes a garden, park, pond, and a memorial to the signers of the United States Declaration of Independence. Just north of Constitution Gardens is the Lockkeeper's House, which is the second oldest building on the mall, after the White House. The house is operated by the National Park Service (NPS) and is open to the public for visitation. Also on the mall are the National World War II Memorial at the east end of the Lincoln Memorial Reflecting Pool, as well as the Korean War Veterans Memorial and the Vietnam Veterans Memorial.

Directly south of the mall, the Tidal Basin features rows of Japanese cherry trees. Every spring, millions of cherry blossoms bloom, an event which attracts visitors from across the world as part of the annual National Cherry Blossom Festival. The Franklin Delano Roosevelt Memorial, George Mason Memorial, Jefferson Memorial, Martin Luther King Jr. Memorial, and the District of Columbia War Memorial are around the Tidal Basin.

Other landmarks 

Numerous historic landmarks are located outside the National Mall. Among these are the Old Post Office, the Treasury Building, Old Patent Office Building, the National Cathedral, the Basilica of the National Shrine of the Immaculate Conception, the National World War I Memorial, the Frederick Douglass National Historic Site, Lincoln's Cottage, the Dwight D. Eisenhower Memorial, and the United States Navy Memorial. The Octagon House, which was the building that President James Madison and his administration moved into following the burning of the White House during the War of 1812, is now a historic museum and popular tourist destination.

The National Archives is headquartered in a building just north of the National Mall and houses thousands of documents important to American history, including the Declaration of Independence, the Constitution, and the Bill of Rights. Located in three buildings on Capitol Hill, the Library of Congress is the largest library complex in the world with a collection of more than 147 million books, manuscripts, and other materials. The United States Supreme Court is located immediately north of the Library of Congress. The United States Supreme Court Building was completed in 1935; before then, the court held sessions in the Old Senate Chamber of the Capitol.

Chinatown, located just north of the National Mall, houses Capital One Arena, which serves as the home arena to the Washington Capitals of the National Hockey League and the Washington Wizards of the National Basketball Association, and serves as the city's primary indoor entertainment arena. Chinatown includes several Chinese restaurants and shops. The Friendship Archway is one of the largest Chinese ceremonial archways outside of China and bears the Chinese characters for "Chinatown" below its roof.

The Southwest Waterfront along the Potomac River has been redeveloped in recent years and now serves as a popular cultural center. The Wharf, as it is called, contains the city's historic Maine Avenue Fish Market. This is the oldest fish market currently in operation in the entire United States. The Wharf also has many hotels, residential buildings, restaurants, shops, parks, piers, docks and marinas, and live music venues.

Several other landmarks are located in neighboring Northern Virginia. Among these are Arlington National Cemetery, including the Tomb of the Unknown Soldier, The Pentagon, the 9/11 Pentagon Memorial, the United States Air Force Memorial, Old Town Alexandria, and Mount Vernon, the former home of George Washington. National Harbor in Prince George's County, Maryland, and its Capital Wheel, a ferris wheel providing riders with views of the D.C. area, are also notable landmarks. The National Spelling Bee is held annually since 2011 at the Gaylord National Resort & Convention Center at National Harbor.

Parks 

There are also numerous parks, gardens, squares, and circles that have become notable landmarks, such as Rock Creek Park. Rock Creek Park, located in Northwest D.C., is the largest park in the city and is administered by the National Park Service. Located on the northern side of the White House, Lafayette Square is a historic public square. Named after the Marquis de Lafayette, a Frenchman who served as a commander during the American Revolutionary War, the square has been the site of many protests, marches, and speeches over the decades. The houses bordering the square have served as the home to many notable figures, such as First Lady Dolley Madison and Abraham Lincoln's Secretary of State William H. Seward, who was stabbed by an intruder in his Lafayette Square house on the evening of President Lincoln's assassination. Located next to the square and on Pennsylvania Avenue across from the White House is the Blair House, which serves as the primary state guest house for the U.S. president.

The United States National Arboretum is a dense arboretum in Northeast D.C. filled with gardens and trails. Its most notable landmark is the National Capitol Columns monument. A smaller urban park located in the city's limits is Theodore Roosevelt Island. This is an island in the Potomac River named in honor of President Theodore Roosevelt. The island has many trails used by walkers and runners, as well as a statue and memorial in honor of Theodore Roosevelt.

Other parks, gardens, squares, and circles include Dumbarton Oaks, Meridian Hill Park, the Yards, Anacostia Park, Lincoln Park, Kenilworth Park and Aquatic Gardens, Franklin Square, Washington Circle, Dupont Circle, McPherson Square, Farragut Square, and the Chesapeake and Ohio Canal National Historical Park.

Education 

District of Columbia Public Schools (DCPS), the sole public school district in the city, operates the city's 123 public schools. The number of students in DCPS steadily decreased for 39 years until 2009. In the 2010–11 school year, 46,191 students were enrolled in the public school system. DCPS has one of the highest-cost, yet lowest-performing school systems in the country, in terms of both infrastructure and student achievement. Mayor Adrian Fenty's administration made sweeping changes to the system by closing schools, replacing teachers, firing principals, and using private education firms to aid curriculum development.

The District of Columbia Public Charter School Board monitors the 52 public charter schools in the city. Due to the perceived problems with the traditional public school system, enrollment in public charter schools had by 2007 steadily increased. As of 2010, D.C., charter schools had a total enrollment of about 32,000, a 9% increase from the prior year. The district is also home to 92 private schools, which enrolled approximately 18,000 students in 2008.

Higher education 

Private universities include American University (AU), the Catholic University of America (CUA), Gallaudet University, George Washington University (GWU), Georgetown University (GU), Howard University (HU), the Johns Hopkins University Paul H. Nitze School of Advanced International Studies (SAIS), and Trinity Washington University. The Corcoran College of Art and Design, the oldest art school in the capital, was absorbed into the George Washington University in 2014, now serving as its college of arts. The University of the District of Columbia (UDC) is a public land-grant university providing undergraduate and graduate education.

The district's medical research institutions include Washington Hospital Center and Children's National Medical Center. The city is home to three medical schools and associated teaching hospitals: George Washington, Georgetown, and Howard universities.

Libraries 
Washington, D.C., has dozens of public and private libraries and library systems, including the District of Columbia Public Library system.

Library of Congress 

The Library of Congress (LOC) is the research library that officially serves the United States Congress and is the de facto national library of the United States. It is a complex of three buildings: Thomas Jefferson Building, John Adams Building and James Madison Memorial Building, all located in the Capitol Hill neighborhood. The Jefferson Building houses the library's reading room, a copy of the Gutenberg Bible, Thomas Jefferson's original library, and several museum exhibits.

District of Columbia Public Library 

The District of Columbia Public Library operates 26 neighborhood locations including the landmark Martin Luther King Jr. Memorial Library.

Folger Shakespeare Library 
The Folger Shakespeare Library is a research library and museum located in the Capitol Hill neighborhood. It houses the world's largest collection of Shakespeare-related material and third largest collection of English books printed before 1641. The Folger Library also runs special events and cultural attractions, most notably the Folger Theatre, which is known for being a leading interpreter of Shakespeare works, in addition to those from other authors.

City government and politics

Politics 

Article One, Section Eight of the United States Constitution grants the United States Congress "exclusive jurisdiction" over the city. The district did not have an elected local government until the passage of the 1973 Home Rule Act. The Act devolved certain Congressional powers to an elected mayor and the thirteen-member Council of the District of Columbia. However, Congress retains the right to review and overturn laws created by the council and intervene in local affairs. Washington, D.C., is overwhelmingly Democratic, having voted for the Democratic presidential candidate solidly since it was granted electoral votes in 1964.

Each of the city's eight wards elects a single member of the council and residents elect four at-large members to represent the district as a whole. The council chair is also elected at-large. There are 37 Advisory Neighborhood Commissions (ANCs) elected by small neighborhood districts. ANCs can issue recommendations on all issues that affect residents; government agencies take their advice under careful consideration. The attorney general of the District of Columbia is elected to a four-year term.

Washington, D.C., observes all federal holidays and also celebrates Emancipation Day on April 16, which commemorates the end of slavery in the district. The flag of Washington, D.C., was adopted in 1938 and is a variation on George Washington's family coat of arms.

Washington, D.C., has been a member state of the Unrepresented Nations and Peoples Organization (UNPO) since 2015.

The idiom "Inside the Beltway" is a reference used by media to describe discussions of national political issues inside of Washington, by way of geographical demarcation regarding the region inner to the Capital's Beltway, Interstate 495, the city's highway loop (beltway) constructed in 1964. The phrase is used as a title for a number of political columns and news items by publications like the populist Washington Times.

Budgetary issues 

The mayor and council set local taxes and a budget, which Congress must approve. The Government Accountability Office and other analysts have estimated that the city's high percentage of tax-exempt property and the Congressional prohibition of commuter taxes create a structural deficit in the district's local budget of anywhere between $470 million and over $1 billion per year. Congress typically provides additional grants for federal programs such as Medicaid and the operation of the local justice system; however, analysts claim that the payments do not fully resolve the imbalance.

The city's local government, particularly during the mayoralty of Marion Barry, was criticized for mismanagement and waste. During his administration in 1989, The Washington Monthly magazine claimed that the district had "the worst city government in America". In 1995, at the start of Barry's fourth term, Congress created the District of Columbia Financial Control Board to oversee all municipal spending. Mayor Anthony Williams won election in 1998 and oversaw a period of urban renewal and budget surpluses.

The district regained control over its finances in 2001 and the oversight board's operations were suspended.

The district has a federally funded "Emergency Planning and Security Fund" to cover security related to visits by foreign leaders and diplomats, presidential inaugurations, protests, and terrorism concerns. During the Trump administration, the fund has run with a deficit. Trump's January 2017 inauguration cost the city $27 million; of that, $7 million was never repaid to the fund. Trump's 2019 Independence Day event, "A Salute to America", cost six times more than Independence Day events in past years.

Voting rights debate 

The district is not a state and therefore has no voting representation in Congress. D.C. residents elect a non-voting delegate to the House of Representatives (D.C. at-large), who may sit on committees, participate in debate, and introduce legislation, but cannot vote on the House floor. The district has no official representation in the United States Senate. Neither chamber seats the district's elected "shadow" representative or senators. Unlike residents of U.S. territories such as Puerto Rico or Guam, which also have non-voting delegates, D.C. residents are subject to all federal taxes. In the financial year 2012, D.C. residents and businesses paid $20.7 billion in federal taxes, more than the taxes collected from 19 states and the highest federal taxes per capita.

A 2005 poll found that 78% of Americans did not know residents of Washington, D.C., have less representation in Congress than residents of the fifty states. Efforts to raise awareness about the issue have included campaigns by grassroots organizations and featuring the city's unofficial motto, "End Taxation Without Representation", on D.C. vehicle license plates. There is evidence of nationwide approval for D.C. voting rights; various polls indicate that 61 to 82% of Americans believe D.C. should have voting representation in Congress.

Opponents to federal voting rights for Washington, D.C., propose that the Founding Fathers never intended for district residents to have a vote in Congress since the Constitution makes clear that representation must come from the states. Those opposed to making Washington, D.C., a state claim such a move would destroy the notion of a separate national capital and that statehood would unfairly grant Senate representation to a single city.

Sister cities 
Washington, D.C., has fifteen official sister city agreements. Each of the listed cities is a national capital except for Sunderland, which includes the town of Washington, the ancestral home of George Washington's family. Paris and Rome are each formally recognized as a partner city due to their special one sister city policy. Listed in the order each agreement was first established, they are:

  Bangkok, Thailand (1962, renewed 2002 and 2012)
  Dakar, Senegal (1980, renewed 2006)
  Beijing, China (1984, renewed 2004 and 2012)
  Brussels, Belgium (1985, renewed 2002 and 2011)
  Athens, Greece (2000)
  Paris, France (2000 as a friendship and cooperation agreement, renewed 2005)
  Pretoria, South Africa (2002, renewed 2008 and 2011)
  Seoul, South Korea (2006)
  Accra, Ghana (2006)
  Sunderland, United Kingdom (2006, renewed 2012)
  Rome, Italy (2011, renewed 2013)
  Ankara, Turkey (2011)
  Brasília, Brazil (2013)
  Addis Ababa, Ethiopia (2013)
  San Salvador, El Salvador (2018)

Infrastructure

Transportation

Streets and highways 

Due to the freeway revolts of the 1960s, much of the proposed interstate highway system through the middle of Washington was never built. Interstate 95 (I-95), the nation's major east coast highway, therefore bends around the district to form the eastern portion of the Capital Beltway. A portion of the proposed highway funding was directed to the region's public transportation infrastructure instead. The interstate highways that continue into Washington, including I-66 and I-395, both terminate shortly after entering the city.
According to a 2010 study, Washington-area commuters spent 70 hours a year in traffic delays, which tied with Chicago for having the nation's worst road congestion. However, 37% of Washington-area commuters take public transportation to work, the second-highest rate in the country. An additional 12% of D.C. commuters walked to work, 6% carpooled, and 3% traveled by bicycle in 2010.

Cycling 

Of those miles,  were protected bike lanes. It also boasted  of bike trails.

D.C. is part of the regional Capital Bikeshare program. Started in 2010, it is one of the largest bicycle sharing systems in the country with more than 4,351 bicycles and more than 395 stations, all provided by PBSC Urban Solutions.

Walkability 
A 2021 study by Walk Score ranked Washington, D.C. the fifth-most walkable city in the country. According to the study, the most walkable neighborhoods are U Street, Dupont Circle, and Mount Vernon Square. In 2013, the Washington Metropolitan Area had the eighth lowest percentage of workers who commuted by private automobile (75.7 percent), with 8percent of area workers traveling via rail transit.

River crossings 

There are multiple transportation methods to cross the city's two rivers, the Potomac River and the Anacostia River. There are numerous bridges that take cars, trains, pedestrians, and bikers across the rivers. Among these are Arlington Memorial Bridge, the 14th Street Bridges, Francis Scott Key Bridge, Theodore Roosevelt Bridge, Woodrow Wilson Bridge, and Frederick Douglass Bridge.

There are also ferries and water cruises that cross the Potomac River. One of these is the Potomac Water Taxi, operated by Hornblower Cruises, which goes between the Georgetown Waterfront, the Wharf, the Old Town Alexandria Waterfront, and National Harbor.

Rail 

The Washington Metropolitan Area Transit Authority (WMATA) operates the Washington Metro, the city's rapid transit rail system. The system serves Washington, D.C., as well as its Maryland and Virginia suburbs. Metro is the second-busiest rapid transit system in the country and fifth-busiest in North America. It operates mostly as a deep-level subway in more densely populated parts of the D.C. metropolitan area (including most of the District itself), while most of the suburban tracks are at surface level or elevated. Metro is known for its iconic brutalist-style vaulted ceilings in the interior stations. It is also known for having long escalators in some of its underground stations. The longest single-tier escalator in the Western Hemisphere, spanning , is located at Metro's Wheaton station in Maryland.

Union Station is the city's main train station and serves approximately 70,000 people each day. It is Amtrak's second-busiest station with 4.6 million passengers annually and is the southern terminus for the Northeast Corridor and Acela Express routes. Maryland's MARC and Virginia's VRE commuter trains and the Metrorail Red Line also provide service into Union Station. Following renovations in 2011, Union Station became Washington's primary intercity bus transit center.

Although Washington was famous throughout the 19th and early- to mid-20th centuries for its streetcars, these lines were dismantled in the 1960s. In 2016, however, the city brought back a streetcar line. The DC Streetcar consists of a single line in Northeast D.C., along H Street and Benning Road, known as the H Street/Benning Road Line.

Bus

Two main public bus systems operate in Washington, D.C. Metrobus, operated by WMATA, is the primary public bus system in Washington, D.C. Serving more than 400,000 riders each weekday, it is one of the nation's largest bus systems by annual ridership. The city also operates its own DC Circulator bus system, which connects commercial and touristic areas within central Washington. The DC Circulator costs only $1 to ride and is composed of six distinct routes that cover central D.C. and suburban Rosslyn, Virginia. The DC Circulator is run via a public-private partnerships between the District of Columbia Department of Transportation, WMATA, and DC Surface Transit, Inc. (DCST). The bus system services each stop approximately every 10 minutes.

Many other public bus systems operate in the various jurisdictions of the Washington region outside of the city in suburban Maryland and Virginia. Among these are the Fairfax Connector in Fairfax County, Virginia; DASH in Alexandria, Virginia; and TheBus in Prince George's County, Maryland. There are also numerous commuter buses that residents of the wider Washington region take to commute into the city for work or other events. Among these are the Loudoun County Transit Commuter Bus and the Maryland Transit Administration Commuter Bus.

The city also has numerous buses used by tourists and others visiting the city. Among the most popular tourist buses are Big Bus Tours, Old Town Trolley Tours, and DC Trails. The city also sees many charter buses carrying young students and other tourists from across the country to the Washington region's historic sites. These buses are often found parked beside famous tourist locations, such as the National Mall.

Air 

Three major airports serve the district, though none are within the city's borders. Two of these major airports are located in suburban Virginia and one in suburban Maryland. The closest is Ronald Reagan Washington National Airport, which is located in Arlington, Virginia just across the Potomac River about 5 miles from downtown DC. This airport is primarily reserved for domestic flights and has the lowest number of passengers of any of the three airports in the region. The busiest by international flights and the largest by land size and amount of facilities is Washington Dulles International Airport, located in Dulles, Virginia, about 24 miles west of the city. Dulles has the most international passenger traffic of any airport in the Mid-Atlantic outside the New York metropolitan area, including approximately 90% of the international passenger traffic in the Washington-Baltimore region. The busiest by number of total passenger boardings is Baltimore/Washington International Airport (BWI), located in Anne Arundel County, Maryland about 30 miles northeast of D.C. Each of these three airports also serves as a hub for a major American airline: Reagan is a hub for American Airlines, Dulles is a major hub for United Airlines and Star Alliance partners, and BWI is an operating base for Southwest Airlines.

The President of the United States does not use these airports for travel. Instead, he rides Marine One from the White House lawn to Joint Base Andrews, located just beyond the city's limits in Maryland. There, he takes Air Force One to his destination. The air base was originally built in 1942. From 1942 to 2009, it was solely an Air Force Base, but became a joint Air Force and Naval base in 2009, when Andrews Air Force Base and Naval Air Facility Washington were merged.

Utilities 

The District of Columbia Water and Sewer Authority, also known as WASA or D.C. Water, is an independent authority of the Washington, D.C., government that provides drinking water and wastewater collection in the city. WASA purchases water from the historic Washington Aqueduct, which is operated by the Army Corps of Engineers. The water, sourced from the Potomac River, is treated and stored in the city's Dalecarlia, Georgetown, and McMillan reservoirs. The aqueduct provides drinking water for a total of 1.1 million people in the district and Virginia, including Arlington, Falls Church, and a portion of Fairfax County. The authority also provides sewage treatment services for an additional 1.6 million people in four surrounding Maryland and Virginia counties.

Pepco is the city's electric utility and services 793,000 customers in the district and suburban Maryland. An 1889 law prohibits overhead wires within much of the historic City of Washington. As a result, all power lines and telecommunication cables are located underground in downtown Washington, and traffic signals are placed at the edge of the street. A plan announced in 2013 would bury an additional  of primary power lines throughout the district.

Washington Gas is the city's natural gas utility and serves more than a million customers in the district and its suburbs. Incorporated by Congress in 1848, the company installed the city's first gas lights in the Capitol, White House, and along Pennsylvania Avenue.

Crime 

Some 67,000 residents, about 10% of the population, are ex-convicts.

In 2021 and 2022, the number of homicides continued on an upward trend, both years exceeding 200, a significant rise from previous lows. In 2012, D.C.'s annual murder count had dropped to 88, the lowest total since 1961. The city was once described as the "murder capital" of the United States during the early 1990s. The number of murders peaked in 1991 at 479, but the level of violence then began to decline significantly.

In 2016, the district's Metropolitan Police Department tallied 135 homicides, a 53% increase from 2012 but a 17% decrease from 2015. Many neighborhoods such as Columbia Heights and Logan Circle are becoming safer and vibrant. However, incidents of robberies and thefts have remained higher in these areas because of increased nightlife activity and greater numbers of affluent residents. Even still, citywide reports of both property and violent crimes have declined since their most recent highs in the mid-1990s.

On June 26, 2008, the Supreme Court of the United States held in District of Columbia v. Heller that the city's 1976 handgun ban violated the right to keep and bear arms as protected under the Second Amendment. However, the ruling does not prohibit all forms of gun control; laws requiring firearm registration remain in place, as does the city's assault weapon ban.

In addition to the district's own Metropolitan Police Department, many federal law enforcement agencies have jurisdiction in the city as well—most visibly the U.S. Park Police, founded in 1791.

See also 

 Index of Washington, D.C.–related articles
 Outline of Washington, D.C.
 List of people from Washington, D.C.
 USS District of Columbia

Explanatory notes

References

External links 

 
 Guide to Washington, D.C., materials from the Library of Congress
 
 
 Why is Washington, D.C. Called the District of Columbia?

 
Capitals in North America
Members of the Unrepresented Nations and Peoples Organization
Planned capitals
Planned cities in the United States
Populated places established in 1790
Populated places on the Potomac River
Mid-Atlantic states
Southern United States
Northeastern United States
States and territories established in 1790
Political divisions of the United States
Washington metropolitan area
1790 establishments in the United States
Contiguous United States